The Chevrolet Equinox EV is a battery electric compact crossover SUV to be manufactured by General Motors under the Chevrolet brand in 2023. It was introduced in January 2022 in a set of images at the 2022 Consumer Electronics Show (CES) and is planned to go on sale in the fall of 2023 for the 2024 model year. The Equinox EV features a design and underpinnings different from the ICE-powered Equinox.

Overview 
The Equinox EV will be equipped with GM Ultium batteries shared with other GM battery electric vehicles. The larger Chevrolet Blazer EV will launch before the Equinox EV, in spring 2023.

Trim levels were detailed in September 2022. A larger battery with  range will be optional on the 1LT, and standard on 2LT, 3LT, and RS. A V2L (vehicle-to-load) system will be optional for the 3RS trim level.

No front cargo space ("frunk") is available, the hood houses front drive unit and other electronics instead.

References

External links 

 Official website
 Official press release

Equinox EV
Cars introduced in 2022
Compact sport utility vehicles
Crossover sport utility vehicles
Upcoming car models
Electric concept cars